Legally Blonde: The Musical – The Search for Elle Woods is an MTV program created in order to cast an actress to replace Laura Bell Bundy in the role of Elle Woods in the Broadway production of Legally Blonde: The Musical. The show debuted on June 2, 2008.

The winner of the show, Bailey Hanks, in addition to being cast in the role, was given the opportunity to record her own single of the musical's first-act closer, "So Much Better". The show concluded on July 21, 2008. Autumn Hurlbert was the runner up. She served as Hanks' understudy and performed in the ensemble of the show (replacing Becky Gulsvig who left to join the tour). Bundy's last performance in the musical was on July 20, 2008. Hanks began performances on July 23, 2008 and remained with the show until it closed on October 19, 2008.

Two other show finalists, Rhiannon Hansen and Lauren Zakrin, performed in the "Legally Blonde" national tour. Hansen played Margot, and Zakrin performed in the ensemble as well serving as understudy to Becky Gulsvig as Elle Woods.

The show began with 15 contestants. All except the winner were eliminated over nine episodes, in which they performed songs and faced other challenges.  A three-judge panel made the elimination decisions. Most episodes involved a small prize for the winner of the challenge.

Judges and mentors
Haylie Duff, singer, actress, and Broadway Performer
Jerry Mitchell, director and choreographer of Legally Blonde: The Musical
Paul Canaan, ensemble member of Legally Blonde: The Musical
Bernard Telsey, casting director
Heather Hach, librettist of Legally Blonde: The Musical
Seth Rudetsky, musician, comedian, actor, writer, vocal coach
Denis Jones, Associate Choreographer of Legally Blonde:  The Musical
Marc Bruni, Associate Director of Legally Blonde: The Musical

Contestants

Age at the time of filming.

Episode summaries

In each episode, the contestants met different cast members from the Broadway cast of Legally Blonde: The Musical.  They also studied a song from the show and faced various tests and challenges that were evaluated by the panel of judges.  Most weeks, a challenge winner received a special prize to help them for the upcoming audition.

Episode Number 1 – "You're Cut" (Originally aired June 2, 2008)
50 contestants traveled to New York hoping to star as the next Elle Woods in Legally Blonde: The Musical. An initial dance audition ensued, and the field was narrowed down to 15 girls. The 15 girls learned the song "So Much Better,” and a dance. Later on, the girls auditioned for the judges. Five girls were eliminated as the judges were not satisfied with their singing, and dancing, leaving 10 remaining contestants. The 10 girls were moved to a penthouse to stay for the next 8 weeks for their upcoming auditions.

Episode Number 2 – "And Then There Were 10" (Originally aired June 9, 2008)
Episode 2 was focused on acting.  Scene partner Nikki Snelson (who played Brooke Wyndham in the musical) purposely drops a line during the contestants' auditions to see how the contestants react if their scene partner forgets a line.  The girls also learned the song, "Delta Nu Nu Nu".  The challenge winner, Bailey Hanks, won personal time with Nikki Snelson. She shared the prize with Ridgway.

Episode Number 3 – "Omigod, She Threw Us Under the Bus!" (Originally aired June 16, 2008)
After a grueling vocal workshop on spin bikes to test the contestants' stamina, Cassie S. isolates herself from the other girls by complaining to the judges that the other contestants failed to give their all during her rehearsals.  The episode also focused on the song "Omigod You Guys".  The prize was a manicure and pedicure with Orfeh (who played Paulette in the musical), won by Zakrin and shared with Silva.

Episode Number 4 – "It's Time to Get Serious" (Originally aired June 23, 2008)
The top eight contestants experience illness and nerves, while learning the song "Serious" and performing a challenging comedic scene.  The prize was a date with Richard H. Blake (who played Warner Huntington III in the musical), won by Hurlbert and shared with Carvajal.

Episode Number 5 – "These Pink Boots Are Made For Dancing" (Originally aired June 30, 2008)
The six contestants test their dancing skills on the cobblestoned streets of Brooklyn and face a Hip-Hop dancing challenge ("Shake Your Junk" dance sequence).  The song for the episode was "Positive".  Lander won a yoga lesson with Kate Shindle (who played Vivienne Kensington in the musical), which she shared with Hansen.

Episode Number 6 – "Blonde to the Bone" (Originally aired July 7, 2008)
The final five girls were given makeovers and performed the ballad "Legally Blonde."  The episode's challenge involved modeling.  The song was "Legally Blonde".  Lander won a lunch date with Andy Karl (who played Kyle The UPS Guy and understudied Emmett in the musical).

Episode Number 7 – "Triple Threat Test" (Originally aired July 14, 2008)
Four finalists audition with a challenging number that tests singing, acting and dance.  Their costume change skills were also tested, as was their stamina.  The song featured was "What You Want".  All the girls won dinner at the loft and Legally Blonde-style Tiffany necklaces.

Episode Number 8 – "A Star is Born!" (Originally aired July 21, 2008)
Autumn and Bailey performed three Legally Blonde numbers live at the Palace Theatre on Broadway, and Bailey was declared the winner.  The three songs were "Omigod You Guys", "Positive" and "So Much Better".  In addition to winning a contract to perform the role of Elle Woods on Broadway for at least three months, Hanks was given the opportunity to record her own single of the musical's first-act closer, "So Much Better".  Hurlbert, as the runner up, will act as Hanks' understudy and perform in the ensemble of the show. Zakrin, the third runner up, will understudy the tour's Elle Woods, Becky Gulsvig, and will also be a member of the ensemble. And, Hansen, the second runner up, will play the role of Margot, Elle's best friend, on tour, as well as understudying Elle.

Broadway cast appearances
In each episode, the girls meet a cast member from Legally Blonde: The Musical. Usually, these opportunities were awarded as prizes.

Episode 1: Jerry Mitchell (Director), Laura Bell Bundy (Elle Woods)
Episode 2: Nikki Snelson (Brooke Wyndham)
Episode 3: Orfeh (Paulette Bonafonté)
Episode 4: Boo-Boo (Bruiser), Teddy (Bruiser), Richard H. Blake (Warner Huntington III)
Episode 5: Kate Shindle (Vivienne Kensington), Nick Kenkel (Ensemble)
Episode 6: Laura Bell Bundy, Andy Karl (Grandmaster Chad/Dewey/Kyle; u/s Emmett Forrest)
Episode 7: Rusty Mowery (Dance Captain, Swing), Michelle Kittrell (Ensemble, Dance Captain), Asmeret Ghebremichael (Pilar), April Berry (Ensemble/Kristine the Delta Nu), Manuel Herrera (Ensemble/Nikos), and Nick Kenkel (Ensemble)
Episode 8: Jerry Mitchell, and current cast members

Auditions
These were the following auditions or workshops for each episode. These are similar to "challenges" on other reality shows.

Episode 1: Dancing/Singing
Episode 2: Acting
Episode 3: Stamina
Episode 4: Bonding with Bruiser
Episode 5: Hip-Hop Dancing
Episode 6: Becoming Elle/Modeling
Episode 7: Being a Triple Threat (Singing, Dancing, Acting)/Costume Changes/Stamina
Episode 8: Performing Live at the Palace Theatre

Musical numbers
These were the musical numbers from the Broadway show that the contestants were taught during each episode.

Episode 1: So Much Better
Episode 2: Delta Nu Nu Nu
Episode 3: Omigod You Guys
Episode 4: Serious
Episode 5: Positive ("Shake Your Junk" Dance sequence)
Episode 6: Legally Blonde
Episode 7: What You Want
Episode 8: Omigod You Guys, Positive, and So Much Better

Rewards/Gifts
Episode 1: None
Episode 2: Personal time with Nikki Snelson. Won by Bailey and shared with Lindsey.
Episode 3: Manicure and pedicure with Orfeh. Won by Lauren and shared with Cassie S.
Episode 4: A date with Richard H. Blake. Won by Autumn and shared with Celina.
Episode 5: Yoga lesson with Kate Shindle. Won by Natalie and shared with Rhiannon.
Episode 6: Lunch date with Andy Karl. Won by Natalie.
Episode 7: Dinner at the loft and Legally Blonde-style Tiffany necklaces. Shared by all of the girls.
Episode 8: Becoming Elle Woods. Won by Bailey.

Competition

Elimination process
During the course of the auditions, the three judges determine which girls to eliminate and which ones to continue in the competition. After the judges figure out who will go and who will stay they write the names down, in order by best audition, on "the list" similar to the one referred to during the song So Much Better. Haylie Duff is then given the list and announces the list in order. The remaining girls who are not on the list must immediately head to the building's casting office where the three judges will determine the eliminated contestant.

Elimination chart
 

 The contestant won the role of Elle Woods in Legally Blonde: The Musical.
 The contestant won the reward challenge.
 The contestant was not on the casting list but remained in the competition.
 The contestant won the reward challenge but was not on the casting list and remained in the competition.
 The contestant won the reward challenge, but was eliminated.
 The contestant was eliminated.

In episode 5, the panel of judges informed Natalie that she would be on the list prior to the official announcement of the list.
In episode 7 there was no one on the casting list. Additionally, Lauren was eliminated before Autumn, Bailey, or Rhiannon were told they were safe, so they are listed alphabetically.
On a Zoom reunion call held in April 2020, Rhiannon revealed that although all four girls shared the reward, she won the final challenge.
This elimination is based on the performances in episode 7. It narrowed down the competition to two girls before the second elimination in episode 8, which determined the winner. Also, Rhiannon's elimination was announced before Autumn and Bailey's continuing, so they are listed alphabetically.

After the show
Hanks was chosen as the winner by Jerry Mitchell during her final audition at the Palace Theatre.

Autumn Hurlbert was declared the runner-up and served as Hanks' understudy while also performing in the ensemble.

Finalists Rhiannon Hansen (3rd place) and Lauren Zakrin (4th place) participated in the musical's first national tour, respectively, as Margot and as the understudy for Elle. Zakrin later starred in the 1st National Tour of Wicked in the ensemble and as an understudy for Glinda. Zakrin also closed the Broadway company of Rock of Ages as Sherrie Christian. Zakrin was in the ensemble and an understudy for Natasha in Natasha, Pierre & The Great Comet of 1812 on Broadway, and was with the show in its two previous iterations Off-Broadway. She originated the role of Kathryn Merteuil in Cruel Intentions: The Musical. She most recently was in the ensemble of Jesus Christ Superstar Live in Concert.

Natalie Lander Lives in Los Angeles and has prominent recurring guest star roles on ABC's The Middle, TV Land's Lopez with George Lopez, and TNT's Major Crimes. She was also a series regular on the Disney Junior show Goldie & Bear where she played the lead voice of "Goldie." Natalie has over 80 credits on IMDB that include TV, film, animation, and video game roles. Her father was David L. Lander, who played Squiggy on Laverne & Shirley.

Cassie Silva originated the role of Mrs. Wormwood on the 1st National Tour of Matilda after originally appearing in the Broadway company. She joined the Broadway company of Six as an alternate in 2022.

Celina Carvajal now goes by a shorter version of her name, Lena Hall. She has gone on to originate the role of Nicola in Kinky Boots and has also performed as Yitzak in the 2014 revival of Hedwig and the Angry Inch with Neil Patrick Harris. The role of Yitzak earned her a Tony for Best Featured Actress in a Musical in 2014. Hall is also the lead singer of the band The Deafening.

Emma Zaks, daughter to Tony-Winning Director Jerry Zaks, went on to perform in the Broadway revival of Hair.

Cassie Okenka performed as Dorothy Gale in the national tour of The Wizard of Oz, was the understudy to Bonnie in Bonnie and Clyde on Broadway and recently performed in the 1st National Tour of Wicked in the ensemble and as an understudy for Glinda. Okenka appeared in School of Rock on Broadway where she understudied Patty.

Rachel Potter performed in the ensemble of the 2nd National Tour of Wicked  and as an understudy for Glinda from August 2010 to February 2011, as Wednesday in The Addams Family on Broadway from March 2011 to December 2011 and played The Mistress in the first Broadway revival of Evita in 2012. Potter competed on the 3rd season of The X Factor singing competition show in 2013, and was eliminated during the third live show.

Libby Servais performed as an original cast member of the 2nd National Tour of Wicked from March 2009 to February 2010 in the ensemble and as an understudy for Glinda. She became the standby for Glinda in the San Francisco company of the show from February 2010 to September 2010, when the production closed. She was a standby for several roles in the original Broadway musical Lysistrata Jones. She often covers many female roles as a swing in Wicked's Broadway company.

References

Further reading

External links
 Official MTV site
 

MTV reality television series
2008 American television series debuts
2008 American television series endings
2000s American reality television series
2000s American music television series
Legally Blonde (franchise)